Bernardo Carvalho (born 1960 in Rio de Janeiro) is a Brazilian author and journalist. He was the editor of “Folhetim,” a collection of essays, and is a Paris and New York correspondent for Folha de S.Paulo. His first two novels were edited in France.

His novel Mongólia received the 2003 prize of the Associação Paulista dos Críticos de Arte. He shared the Portugal Telecom Prize for Literature with Dalton Trevisan for his novel Nove Noites.

Awards and recognitions
2008 São Paulo Prize for Literature — Shortlisted in the Best Book of the Year category for O Sol se Põe em São Paulo
2010 São Paulo Prize for Literature — Shortlisted in the Best Book of the Year category for O Filho da Mãe
2014 São Paulo Prize for Literature — Shortlisted in the Best Book of the Year category for Reprodução

Bibliography

 Aberração (short story collection) 1993
 Onze (novel) 1995
 Os Bêbados e os Sonâmbulos (novel) 1996
 Teatro (novel) 1998
 As Iniciais (novel) 1999
 Medo de Sade (novel) 2000
 Nove Noites (novel) 2002 - published in English in 2007 as Nine Nights
 Mongólia (novel) 2003
 O Sol se Põe em São Paulo (novel) 2007
 O Filho da Mãe (novel) 2009
 Reprodução (novel) 2013

References

External links
 Bernardo Carvalho's biography

Brazilian male writers
Brazilian journalists
Male journalists
1960 births
Living people
Writers from Rio de Janeiro (city)